Little Machines is the third studio album by Canadian electropop singer-songwriter Lights, released on September 19, 2014, through Warner Bros. Records. It was preceded in July 2014 by the release of its lead single "Up We Go", which debuted on the Canadian Hot 100 at number 84. In October 2014, Little Machines debuted on the Canadian Albums Chart at number five, and on the US Billboard 200 at number 34. The album sold 8,500 copies in its first week in Canada. On March 15, 2015, 'Little Machines' won the 'Pop Album of the Year' award at the 2015 Juno Awards. The album title comes from a lyric in the song "Running with the Boys".

Background
After promoting the acoustic version of her second studio album, Siberia, in 2013, Lights returned to the studio to work on new material. On Little Machines, Lights was inspired by bold female artists including Björk, Kate Bush, and Patti Smith, while also wanting to remain accessible. Critics have noted the more lighthearted nature of lead single "Up We Go" in comparison to the grittier, more experimental dubstep-pop of Siberia, which is indicative of the sonic direction of the album as a whole.

In an interview with Billboard, Lights explained that while she felt like taking risks on Siberia, Little Machines was more about creating great "incredible songs that everyone can sing along to and lyrically latch onto" and then putting them together as an album. Working with producer Drew Pearson and Mark "Spike" Stent, Lights captured a "timeless electronic sound" and found herself lyrically gravitating towards themes of nostalgia and naivety. Lights has described the album as "a triumph after a hard dry spell" and "a complete journey, from front to back," noting that during the recording process she found herself "[turning] to poetry, art and female songwriting legends ... and just enjoying [herself] again."

Lights recorded the album while pregnant with her first child and noted that for certain songs she had to alter the way she sang due to her diaphragm muscles tightening. She recorded the vocals to the song "Muscle Memory" while in the early stages of labor which required her to take multiple breaks.

Promotion
Little Machines was made available for pre-order on July 22, 2014, with lead single "Up We Go" also available for purchase at that time. The announcement came after a ten-day countdown on Lights' official social media pages. To promote the album, Lights toured in the US during the fall, starting October 24 in Portland, Maine.

Singles
"Up We Go" was released to digital retailers and Canadian radio on July 22, 2014. It was serviced to modern rock radio in the United States on September 9. It debuted at No. 84 on the Billboard Canadian Hot 100 for the week of August 9, and at No. 42 on the Canada CHR/Top 40 airplay chart for the week of September 13. The official music video premiered September 3.

"Running with the Boys" was released as the second countdown single on September 9, 2014. It was subsequently serviced to Canadian radio in January 2015 as the second official single off the album. The music video debuted January 30, 2015.

Other songs
 "Portal" was released to iTunes as the first countdown single on August 12, 2014, along with an official music video that premiered the same day.
 "Same Sea" was released January 19, 2015 as the third promotional single off the album, with the K.Flay Remix premiering that day.

Track listing

Personnel
Credits and personnel for Little Machines:

Matt Barnes - photography
Beau Bokan - vocals 
Joäh Carvalho - mastering
Jeff Fenster - A&R
Maurie Kaufmann - drums
Lights - vocals , bass, composer, creative director, drum programming, guitar, synthesizer
Blake Mares - assistant engineer
Pherbie Midgely - assistant engineer
Jay "Human Kebab" Parsons - composer, programming
Ashley Poitevin - marketing
Thomas "Tawgs" Salter - additional production, bass, composer, guitar, producer, synthesizer
Spike Stent - mixing
Alex Tenta - design and layout
Adam Weaver - synthesizer

Charts

Weekly charts

Certifications

Release history

References

2014 albums
Lights (musician) albums
Warner Records albums
Juno Award for Pop Album of the Year albums